Faracho (Geʽez: ፋራቾ) or Abala Faracho is a town in Wolayita Zone, Southern Nations, Nationalities, and Peoples' Region, Ethiopia. The town is an administrative center of Abala Abaya district of Wolayita Zone, Ethiopia. Faracho is located about 349 km away from Addis Ababa to the south and also 30 km away from Sodo to the South, the capital of Wolaita Zone. The amenities in the town are, 24 hours electricity, pure public water, banks, schools, postal service, telecommunications services and others. Faracho lies between 6°55'0" N and 37°39'0" E. The town is located at an elevation of 1,378 meters above sea level.

Climate 
Faracho receives annual rainfall of 50 up to 300 mm. The monthly mean maximum temperature of the area is 32°C, while its minimum temperature is 15.5°C. The soil type of the town is silty clay.

References 

Wolayita
Populated places in the Southern Nations, Nationalities, and Peoples' Region
Cities and towns in Wolayita Zone